Simon Maunoury (born 24 November 1983) is a French badminton player. He won the men's singles title at the French National Badminton Championships in 2006 and 2007.

Achievements

BWF International Challenge/Series 
Men's singles

  BWF International Challenge tournament
  BWF International Series tournament
  BWF Future Series tournament

References

External links 
 

1983 births
Living people
Place of birth missing (living people)
French male badminton players